Weißeck may refer to:
 Weißeck (2,711 m), the highest mountain in the Radstadt Tauern range in the Alps
 the German name of the Polish town of Wysoka between 1942 and 1945